The Hutchinson micropolitan area may refer to:

The Hutchinson, Kansas micropolitan area, United States
The Hutchinson, Minnesota micropolitan area, United States

See also
Hutchinson (disambiguation)